The Indian women's cricket team toured Australia and New Zealand in month December-January of Season 1976-77. The tour included one Women's Test match against New Zealand and one against Australia. Tour also included 5 First-class matches, 4 List A matches and 3 other matches played between India and various domestic teams in New Zealand.

Only Test New Zealand vs India

Only Test Australia vs India

References 

January 1977 sports events in Oceania
January 1977 sports events in Australia
January 1977 sports events in New Zealand
1977 in women's cricket
India 1977
India 1977
Australia 1977
1977 in Indian cricket
1977 in New Zealand cricket
1977 in Australian cricket